Artyom Igorevich Korzhunov (born 10 June 1995) is a Russian football player. He plays for FC Forte Taganrog.

Club career
He made his professional debut in the Russian Professional Football League for FC Amur-2010 Blagoveshchensk on 22 April 2014 in a game against FC Sakhalin Yuzhno-Sakhalinsk.

He made his Russian Football National League debut for FC Sibir Novosibirsk on 3 September 2016 in a game against FC Shinnik Yaroslavl.

References

1995 births
People from Blagoveshchensk
Living people
Russian footballers
Association football midfielders
FC Sibir Novosibirsk players
FC Chayka Peschanokopskoye players
Sportspeople from Amur Oblast